Amanita pekeoides is a species of fungus in the family Amanitaceae. It was first described scientifically by New Zealand mycologist Geoff Ridley in 1991.

See also

List of Amanita species

References

External links

pekeoides
Fungi of New Zealand
Fungi described in 1991